Atanaska Stefanova Angelova (born 21 September 1972 in Rousse) is a retired female discus thrower from Bulgaria. She set her personal best (58.94 metres) in the women's discus throw event on 10 August 1995 at the World Championships in Gothenburg, Sweden, where she didn't reach the final round. Angelova also competed for her native country at the 1996 Summer Olympics.

International competitions

References

sports-reference

1972 births
Living people
Bulgarian female discus throwers
Olympic athletes of Bulgaria
Athletes (track and field) at the 1996 Summer Olympics
World Athletics Championships athletes for Bulgaria
Sportspeople from Ruse, Bulgaria